The 2005 UCI Track Cycling World Championships were the World Championship for track cycling. They took place in Los Angeles, United States from March 24 to March 27, 2005.

Medal table

Medal summary

External links
Results book
2005 UCI Track Cycling World Championships - CM Los Angeles, CA, USA, March 24-27, 2005 Cycling News

 
UCI Track cycling
Uci Track Cycling World Championships, 2005
UCI Track Cycling
Sports competitions in Carson, California
International sports competitions in California
International cycle races hosted by the United States
Track cycling
UCI Track Cycling World Championships by year
March 2005 sports events in the United States